Animatronics is the use of mechatronics to create machines which simulate animate life with lifelike characteristics.

Animatronics may also refer to:

Animatronic (album), by the Kovenant
Audio-Animatronics, a form of robotics created by Walt Disney Imagineering

See also
 Ana Matronic, American singer